Mahmoud Rashdan (born 28 September 1986) is a Qatari footballer who is currently playing for Al Kharitiyath.

External links
 QSL.com.qa profile
 Goalzz.com profile

1986 births
Living people
Al-Rayyan SC players
Al Kharaitiyat SC players
Qatar Stars League players
Qatari footballers
Association football midfielders